The Copa Chile 1977 was the 8th edition of the Chilean Cup tournament. The competition started on February 6, 1977, and concluded on April 9, 1977. Palestino won the competition for their second time, beating Unión Española 4-3 on the final.

Calendar

Group Round

Group 1

Group 2

Group 3

Group 4

Group 5

Group 6

Group 7

Group 8

Quarterfinals

|}

Semifinals

Final

Top goalscorer
Oscar Fabbiani (Palestino) 11 goals

See also
 1977 Campeonato Nacional
 Primera B

References
Revista Estadio, (Santiago, Chile) February–April 1977 (scores & information)
RSSSF

Copa Chile
Chile
1977